Cueca is a family of musical styles and associated dances from Chile, Argentina, and Bolivia. In Chile, the cueca holds the status of national dance, where it was officially declared as such by the Pinochet dictatorship on September 18, 1979.

Origins 

While cueca's origins are not clearly defined, it is considered to have mostly European Spanish and arguably indigenous influences. The most widespread version of its origins relates it with the zamacueca which arose in Peru as a variation of Spanish Fandango dancing with criollo.  The dance is then thought to have passed to Chile and Bolivia, where its name was shortened and where it continued to evolve. Due to the dance's popularity in the region, the Peruvian evolution of the zamacueca was nicknamed "la chilena", "the Chilean", due to similarities between the dances. Later, after the Pacific War, the term marinera, in honor of Peru's naval combatants and because of hostile attitude towards Chile, was used in place of "la chilena." In March 1879 the writer and musician Abelardo Gamarra renamed the “chilena” as the “marinera”. The Marinera, Zamba and the Cueca styles are distinct from each other and from their root dance, the zamacueca.

Another theory is that Cueca originated in the early nineteenth century bordellos of South America, as a pas de deux facilitating partner finding.

The usual interpretation of this courting dance is zoomorphic: it tries to reenact the courting ritual of a rooster and a hen. The male displays a quite enthusiastic and at times even aggressive attitude while attempting to court the female, who is elusive, defensive and demure. The dance often finishes with the man kneeling on one knee, with the woman placing her foot triumphantly on his raised knee.

In Bolivia, there are  many variations throughout the different regions. Cueca styles of La Paz, Potosí and Sucre are the elegant and static versions, whereas in Cochabamba and Tarija the style is much livelier and free. The same could be said with the music where in different regions rhythm and speed slightly differ amongst the regions. While dancing, handkerchiefs are used by both male and female dancers by twirling over the head. It is said the twirling of the handkerchief is a way to lure the woman.

History in Chile 
In Chile the cueca was developed and spread in the bars and taverns, which in the nineteenth century were popular centers of entertainment and parties. During Fred Warpole's stay in Chile between 1844 and 1848 he described some of the characteristics of the dance: guitar or harp accompaniment, drumming of hands or a tambourine to keep the rhythm, high pitched singing and a unique strumming pattern, where the guitarist strums all of the strings, returning each time with a slap on the guitar body.

Chilean cueca is not Zamacueca but, a mixture of different dances of the time, where Zamacueca is just one of the influential aspects of the genre. Chilean cueca is highly structured in terms of dance, lyrics and music a characteristic of early European dances of colonial times. The genre do have some aspects of Afro oriented music such as Zamacueca however, cueca is a mixture of different genres and the best of way to understand the evolution of Chilean cueca is to observe the different Spanish, European and popular dances of the time. The arábigo-andaluza influence is considered the most important contribution of cueca in all aspects including, dancing, singing and tempo and is considered the primary root of the genre. See "Memoria Chilena, Biblioteca Nacional de Chile".

During the second half of the nineteenth century the cueca was spread to diverse Latin American countries and the dance was known simply as the "chilena" (Chilean). In Argentina the dance was first introduced in Cuyo, which is in the central west of the country close to the border with Chile; there is documented presence of the cueca in this region in approximately 1840. Unlike in the northeast and central west of Argentina in Buenos Aires the dance was known as the "cueca" instead of the "chilena" and there is documentation of the cueca being present in Buenos Aires as early as the 1850s. Similarly to the majority of Argentina the cueca was known as the "chilena" in Bolivia as well. Chilean sailors and adventurers spread the cueca to the coast of Mexico in the cities of Guerrero and Oaxaca, where the dance was also known as the "chilena". In Peru the dance transformed into one of the most popular dances during the 1860s and 1870s and was also known as the “chilena”.

Twentieth century
During the twentieth century the cueca was associated with the common man in Chile and through them the dance was spread to the pre-industrialized urban areas where it was adopted by neighborhoods like La Vega, Estación and Matadero, which at the time were located on the outskirts of the city of Santiago. Cueca and Mexican music coexisted with similar levels of popularity in the Chilean countryside in the 1970s. Being distinctly Chilean the cueca was selected by the military dictatorship of Pinochet as a music to be promoted.

The cueca was named the national dance of Chile due to its substantial presence throughout the history of the country and announced as such through a public decree in the Official Journal (Diario Oficial) on November 6, 1979. Cueca specialist Emilio Ignacio Santana argues that the dictatorship's appropriation and promotion of cueca harmed the genre. The dictatorship's endorsement of the genre meant according to Santana that the rich landlord huaso became the icon of the cueca and not the rural labourer.

Cueca sola
 is a solo variant of the cueca created in 1978 by Violeta Zúñiga and other members of the Association of Families of the Detained-Disappeared (AFDD) as a method of non-violent protest against the Pinochet dictatorship. It was performed by a woman (arpillerista) dancing alone with a photograph of her disappeared loved one in her hands. 

This symbolic gesture of resistance inspired the 1987 song "They Dance Alone (Cueca Solo)" by Sting. The television campaign advertising for the "No" option at the 1988 Chilean national plebiscite featured a group of women (played by real life relatives of the disappeared) singing and dancing the cueca sola. The surviving members of the group would later re-enact this scene for the 2012 Academy Award-nominated film No, directed by Pablo Larraín.

Clothing and dance

The clothing worn during the cueca dance is the traditional Chilean clothes. They wear blue, white, red or black costumes and dresses.  The men in the dance wear the huaso's hat, shirts, flannel poncho, riding pants and boots, short jacket, riding boots, and spurs. Women wear flowered dresses. Cueca dancing resembles a rooster-chicken relationship. The man approaches the woman and offers his arm, then the woman accompanies him and they walk around the room. They then face each other and hold their handkerchief in the air, and begin to dance. They never touch, but still maintain contact through facial expressions and movements. During the dance, the pair must wave the white handkerchief.

Basic structure

Some differences can be noticed depending on geographical location. There are three distinct variants in addition to the traditional cueca:

 The northern cueca: The main difference with this version is that there is no singing in the accompanying music which is played with only sicus, zamponas, and brass. trumpets, tubas. Also, both the music and the dance are slower. This dance is done during religious ceremonies and carnival.
 The cueca from the central region: This genre is mostly seen in Chile. The guitar, accordion, guitarron, and percussion are the prevailing instruments.
The Chiloé cueca: This form has the absence of the cuarteta. The seguidilla are repeated and there is a greater emphasis on the way the lyrics are presented by the vocalist.

The cueca nowadays

Currently, the cueca is mainly danced in the countryside, and performed throughout Chile each year during the national holidays in September 18 eve. Cueca tournaments are popular around that time of year.

In Bolivia, Cueca styles vary by region: Cueca Paceña, Cueca Cochabambina, Cueca Chuquisaqueña, Cueca Tarijeña, Cueca Potosina y Cueca Chaqueña. What they have in common is their rhythm, but they differ much in velocity, costumes and style. The Cueca styles of La Paz, Potosí and Sucre are the elegant ones, whereas in Cochabamba and Tarija the style is much more lively. In Bolivia, it is usually called "Cuequita Boliviana"

In Argentina, there are many ways of dancing Cueca. Cueca is mostly danced in the northern and western Argentine provinces of Mendoza, Chaco, Salta, Jujuy, Catamarca, La Rioja etc. Each Argentine province has its own style and way of dancing Cueca.

Cueca in Tarija, Bolivia

Tarija, Bolivia, has a few traditional songs which are accompanied by dances. One of which is the Cueca Tarijena. Although it may have the same name as the dances in the other departments, such as Cueca Pacena which represents La Paz, each department's dance varies significantly. It is known for being the most upbeat, fun, and playful in comparison to the others which are more tranquil. Additionally, they were the first place to incorporate a violin into our song, thus giving it more flare and excitement. The Cueca, since its origin, has been a source of happiness for the dancers because the music is generally lively and the dances require partners to be excited about dancing with each other.

Cueca is that is danced with a handkerchief, and this is how one shows affection for others. Everyone begins the dance with the handkerchief in their right hand and twirls it in circles near their shoulder and then proceeds to waive it by the left side of their waist during certain beats. During the entirety of the dance, the man is attempting to “win over” his partner by showing his dancing talents. The dance demonstrates how Bolivian gender roles remain quite male-dominated. Throughout most of the dance, the women simply sway their hips side to side, whereas the men turn in circles and do more complicated movements. This dance is designed for women to show off their beauty and men to demonstrate their talent. The women always follow the male lead because when they are facing each other, it is up to him to decide if he'd like to flirt with his partner by putting his handkerchief near her neck and shoulders, if he'd like to hold the handkerchief behind her neck holding it with both hands, or if he doesn't want to flirt with her, he will simply continue waiving his handkerchief near his shoulder and waist. This is the determining factor to see if they will dance together in the next part of the song, or if they would need to find other partners. Although we’re in 2018 and most places are working towards equality between women and men, this dance represents the misogyny that still exists today by letting the man choose if he likes his partner with the woman having no say about how she feels.

See also
Chinchinero

References

External links

Demonstration of Bolivian cueca (and other folk dances specific to the Gran Chaco region) on YouTube

Bolivian culture
Argentine styles of music
Chilean culture
National symbols of Chile
Bolivian dances
Chilean dances
Argentine dances
Dance in Argentina
Native American dances